Song Dao is a district (amphoe) in the western part of Sakon Nakhon province, northeast Thailand.

Geography
Neighboring districts are (from the north clockwise) Sawang Daen Din district and Phang Khon of Sakon Nakhon Province and Chai Wan of Udon Thani province.

History
As the mountainous area was originally covered with dense forests, it was a popular hideaway of robbers, who robbed travelers on the way between Kalasin and Udon Thani. At that time it was known as Song Dao Chon (ซ่องดาวโจร), which means 'den of thieves'. After the government cleaned up the area in the 19th century, it was renamed Song Dao, which means 'shining star'.

The minor district (king amphoe) Song Dao was created on 1 April 1972, when the three tambons Song Dao, Watthana, and Tha Sila were split off from Sawang Daen Din district. It was upgraded to a full district on 8 September 1976.

Administration
The district is divided into four sub-districts (tambons), which are further subdivided into 46 villages (mubans). Song Dao is a township (thesaban tambon) which covers parts of tambons Song Dao and Pathum Wapi. There are a further four tambon administrative organizations (TAO).

References

External links
amphoe.com

Song Dao